Dančević is a Croatian and Serbian surname. Notable people with the surname include:

Frank Dancevic (born 1984), Canadian tennis player
Tinka Dančević (born 1980), retired Croatian swimmer

Croatian surnames
Serbian surnames
Slavic-language surnames
Patronymic surnames